Gymnomenia is a genus of pholidoskepian solenogasters, shell-less, worm-like mollusks.

References

Pholidoskepia